Oscar Brookin (or Brookins) (19 July 1869 in Byron, Wisconsin – 18 August 1938) served in the United States Army during the Spanish–American War. He received the Medal of Honor for his actions during the Battle of El Caney.

Brookin joined the army from Milwaukee, Wisconsin in January 1893, and served until being discharged in March 1899. He died in 1938 and is buried in Sunset Cemetery in Galloway, Ohio.

Medal of Honor citation
His award citation reads:

For The President of the United States of America, in the name of Congress, takes pleasure in presenting the Medal of Honor to Private Oscar Brookin, United States Army, for extraordinary heroism on 1 July 1898, while serving with Company C, 17th U.S. Infantry, in action at El Caney, Cuba. Private Brookin gallantly assisted in the rescue of the wounded from in front of the lines and under heavy fire from the enemy.

See also

 List of Medal of Honor recipients

References

1869 births
1938 deaths
Military personnel from Wisconsin
United States Army soldiers
American military personnel of the Spanish–American War
United States Army Medal of Honor recipients
Spanish–American War recipients of the Medal of Honor
People from Byron, Fond du Lac County, Wisconsin